Chicopee may refer to:

Place names
In the United States:
Chicopee, Georgia, a village that is part of the city of Gainesville.
Chicopee, Kansas
Chicopee, Massachusetts
Chicopee River, Massachusetts
Chicopee Valley Aqueduct
Chicopee Falls Dam
Chicopee, Missouri

Vessels
USS Chicopee (1863), a Civil War era vessel
Chicopee class oiler, a modern class of vessels
USS Chicopee (AO-34)
Chicopee (brig), built in Medford, MA, 1845

Other uses
Chicopee Ski Club, Kitchener, Ontario, Canada